Alumni Field at The Wilpon Complex (formerly the Varsity Diamond) is the home field for the Michigan Wolverines softball team. It is on the campus of University of Michigan in Ann Arbor, Michigan.

References

External links 
 Alumni Field at The Wilpon Complex
 Michigan Softball

Softball venues in the United States
College softball venues in the United States
Sports venues in Ann Arbor, Michigan
Multi-purpose stadiums in the United States
Sports venues completed in 1982
1982 establishments in Michigan
Sports venues in Washtenaw County, Michigan
Event venues established in 1982
Softball venues in Michigan
University of Michigan campus